The San Diego Gulls is the name of five different ice hockey teams based in San Diego, California. 

 San Diego Gulls (1966–1974), a minor professional team in the Western Hockey League
 San Diego Gulls (1990–1995), a minor professional team in the International Hockey League
 San Diego Gulls (1995–2006), a minor professional team in the West Coast Hockey League, and later the ECHL
 San Diego Gulls (2008–2015), a junior team founded as the San Diego Surf in 2001 and continuing as the San Diego Sabers since 2015
 San Diego Gulls, a minor professional team in the American Hockey League that began play in the 2015–16 season